Mantidactylus noralottae is a species of frog in the family Mantellidae. The species is endemic to Madagascar.

References

noralottae
Amphibians described in 2007
Frogs of Africa
Endemic fauna of Madagascar